Metro Wierzbno is a station on Line M1 of the Warsaw Metro, located in the Wierzbno neighbourhood, from which it derives its name. The station is in the Mokotów district of Warsaw.

The station was opened on 7 April 1995 as part of the inaugural stretch of the Warsaw Metro, between Kabaty and Politechnika.

References

External links

Railway stations in Poland opened in 1995
Line 1 (Warsaw Metro) stations
Mokotów